Cerium hexaboride (CeB6, also called cerium boride, CeBix, CEBIX, and (incorrectly) CeB) is an inorganic chemical, a boride of cerium. It is a refractory ceramic material. It has a low work function, one of the highest electron emissivities known, and is stable in vacuum. The principal use of cerium hexaboride is a coating of hot cathodes. It usually operates at temperature of 1450 °C.

Applications 

Lanthanum hexaboride (LaB6) and cerium hexaboride (CeB6) are used as coating of some high-current hot cathodes. Hexaborides show low work function, around 2.5 eV. They are also somewhat resistant to cathode poisoning. Cerium boride cathodes show lower evaporation rate at 1700 K than lanthanum boride, but it becomes equal at 1850 K and higher above that. Cerium boride cathodes have one and half the lifetime of lanthanum boride, due to its higher resistance to carbon contamination. Boride cathodes are about ten times as "bright" than the tungsten ones and have 10–15 times longer lifetime. In some laboratory tests, CeB6 has proven to be more resistant to the negative impact of carbon contamination than LaB6. They are used e.g. in electron microscopes, microwave tubes, electron lithography, electron beam welding, X-Ray tubes, and free electron lasers.

Cerium hexaboride, like lanthanum hexaboride, slowly evaporates during cathode operation. In conditions where CeB6 cathodes are operated below 1850 K, CeB6 should maintain its optimum shape longer and therefore last longer. While the process is about 30% slower than with lanthanum boride, the cerium boride deposits are reported to be more difficult to remove.

Ce heavy fermion compounds have attracted much attention since they show a variety of unusual and interesting macroscopic properties. In particular, interest has been focused on the 4f narrow-band occupancy, and the role of hybridization with the conduction band states which strongly affects the physical properties.

References

Cerium compounds
Borides
Refractory materials
Ceramic materials